Greatest Remixes Vol. 1 is a compilation album of remixes by American dance music record producers Clivillés + Cole, released in 1992. The album includes remixes of Clivillés + Cole's own tracks along with their remixes of songs by other artists.

Track listing
"C&C Music Factory MTV "Medley"" – C+C Music Factory 
"Because of You" – The Cover Girls
"Don't Take Your Love Away" – Lydia Lee Love	
"Two to Make It Right" – Seduction	
"Pride (In the Name of Love)" [Techno House Version] – Clivillés + Cole	
"Let the Beat Hit 'Em" – Lisa Lisa and Cult Jam	
"Mind Your Business" – Clivillés + Cole	
"You Take My Breath Away" – David Cole	
"A Deeper Love" – Clivillés + Cole (lead vocals by Deborah Cooper)
"Clouds" – Chaka Khan	
"True Love" – Billy	
"Notice Me" – Sandeé
"Do It Properly" – 2 Puerto Ricans, a Blackman and a Dominican

Personnel
Adapted from AllMusic.

2 Puerto Ricans, a Blackman and a Dominican – performer, primary artist
Barbera Aimes – engineer
James T. Alfano – assistant engineer, programming
Ron Allaire – assistant engineer
Fernando Aponte – assistant engineer, engineer
Rodney Ascue – mixing
Nick Ashford – composer
Christopher Austopchuk – art direction
Karen Bernod – background vocals
Billy – performer, primary artist
C+C Music Factory – performer, primary artist
Albert Cabrera – editing
Bruce Calder – assistant engineer
Bonzai Jim Caruso – engineer
Jim Caruso – engineer, producer
Clivillés and Cole – performer, primary artist
Robert Clivillés – arranger, composer, drums, editing, keyboards, mixing, percussion, producer, vocals, background vocals
David Cole – arranger, composer, drums, keyboard arrangements, keyboards, mixing, percussion, performer, primary artist, producer, vocals, background vocals
Deborah Cooper – vocals, background vocals
The Cover Girls – performer, primary artist
Ricky Crespo – editing, keyboards, mixing, producer
Zelma Davis – vocals
Craig Derry – background vocals 
Will Downing – background vocals
Alan Friedman – assistant producer, composer, overdubs, producer, programming
April Harris – vocals
Alec Head – engineer
Joe Hornof – programming
Richard Joseph – engineer
Acar S. Key – engineer, mixing
Chaka Khan – performer, primary artist
Lisa Lisa – performer, vocals, background vocals
Lisa Lisa and Cult Jam – performer, primary artist
Lydia Lee Love – primary artist
Arif Mardin – producer
Veronica McHugh – coordination
Bruce Miller – engineer
George Morel – editing
Ken Nahoum – art direction
John Parthum – assistant engineer
Jimmy Paterson – assistant engineer
Paul Pesco – guitar, vocals
Brian Pollack – assistant engineer
Duran Ramos – composer
Bob Rosa – editing, mixing
Angel Sabater – vocals
Sandeé – performer, primary artist
Seduction – performer, primary artist
Valerie Simpson – composer
Carole Sylvan – background vocals
Ken Taylor – composer
U2 – composer
Barbara Warren-Pace – coordination
Martha Wash – vocals
Freedom Williams – composer, vocals
Norma Jean Wright – background vocals
Tonya Wynn – composer, vocals
Larry Yasgar – executive producer

Charts

Weekly charts

References

External links
Greatest Remixes Vol. 1 at Discogs

1992 albums
Columbia Records albums
Columbia Records remix albums
Albums produced by David Cole (record producer)